Dhi Qar Governorate is a governorate in southern Iraq, in the Arabian Peninsula. The provincial capital is Nasiriyah. Prior to 1976 the governorate was known as Muntafiq Governorate. Thi Qar was the heartland of the ancient Iraqi civilization of Sumer, and includes the ruins of Ur, Eridu, Lagash, Larsa, Girsu, Umma, and Bad-tibira. The southern area of the governorate is covered by Mesopotamian Marshes.

History

Ancient history

Battle of Dhi Qar

Government
Governor: Yahia Nasseri
Deputy Governor: Ahmed al-Sheik Taha 
Governorate Council Chairman (GCC): Ihsan Al-Taei

Modern Dhi Qar
The governorate includes the towns of al-Rifai, Qalat Sukkar, Ash Shatrah, al-Gharraf, Suq al-Shuyouk, Khamisiyah and al-Chibayish.

In the mid-1990s the governor was Tahir Jalil Habbush al-Tikriti, who later became police chief of the country, and in 1999, director of the Iraqi Intelligence Service.

Demographics

The population is approximately 2,000,000, predominantly Shia Arab. The southern marshes have traditionally been home to many Marsh Arabs.

As of 2007, the area is very poor, with an unemployment rate of 31% and a poverty rate of 32%.

Districts
 Al-Chibayish
 Al-Rifa'i
 Shatrah
 Nasiriyah
 Suq Al-Shuykh

See also
 Al-Habboubi Square
 Ayad Radhi
 Cradle of civilization

References

External links
Iraq Inter-Agency Information & Analysis Unit Reports, Maps and Assessments of Iraq's Governorates from the UN Inter-Agency Information & Analysis Unit

 
Governorates of Iraq
1976 establishments in Iraq
States and territories established in 1976